"Deeper Understanding" is a song by Kate Bush released as the lead single from the 2011 album Director's Cut. The single was a re-working of the song originally released on her 1989 album, The Sensual World. The song's lyrics describe an increasingly intense relationship between a lonely person and a computer. It is her first single release since 2005.

Background 
Kate Bush explained that the song is about how people are replacing human relationships with technology:

"This is about people... well, about the modern situation, where more and more people are having less contact with human beings. We spend all day with machines; all night with machines. You know, all day, you're on the phone, all night you're watching telly. Press a button, this happens. [...] And this is the idea of someone who spends all their time with their computer and, like a lot of people, they spend an obsessive amount of time with their computer. People really build up heavy relationships with their computers!"

Song information 
The Director's Cut version of the song is almost two minutes longer than the original recording on The Sensual World, and features re-recorded vocals and a harmonica solo at the end. The later version features the voice of her son, Albert, on the chorus, performing the role of the computer. For the original recording, the chorus vocals were distorted using a very basic vocoder, and needed backing vocals just to make the words audible. For the Director's Cut version, Bush was able to present it as a solitary computerized voice, as was her original intention. This is not the first time Bush worked with her son; he makes a brief spoken word appearance on her previous album Aerial on Disc 2, "A Sky of Honey".

Music video 
A short film to accompany the track premiered on Kate Bush's official YouTube channel on Monday, 25 April 2011. It is directed by Bush herself and stars Robbie Coltrane, Frances Barber, Noel Fielding, and the voice of her son Albert, who plays the role of the computer program. Music website Consequence of Sound reviewed the video and briefly explained it: The video adapts the song's core plot – a person becoming addicted to a program called Voice Console deeply, emotionally attaching themselves to it to the point of separation with friends and family. Robbie Coltrane, best known for his work in Harry Potter as Hagrid, plays the computer junkie who leaves behind his wife and two sons to escape with the program. In the video, Voice Console is a pair of feminine lips on a screen (Bush's son Albert) with an eerie inhuman blackness behind them [...]. The program spouts hallucinogenic wave forms that cast Coltrane into a state of euphoria. When the family finally steps in to disable the sinister program, Coltrane turns on them and in his withdrawal things get very dark and strange.

Release 
The song premiered on BBC Radio 2 on Monday 4 April 2011 on The Ken Bruce Show and was made available for streaming on Kate Bush's official YouTube channel after the radio premiere. "Deeper Understanding" was released as a digital download single on Tuesday 5 April. The song was the Record of the Week on Radio 2 and was played each day Bruce's show and Alex Lester's programme.

Charts

References

External links 
Kate Bush Official Website
 .

2011 singles
Kate Bush songs
Songs written by Kate Bush
EMI Records singles
1989 songs